Clathria elegans is a species of sea sponge in the family Microcionidae. It is found in the United States part of the North Atlantic Ocean. It was first described in 1880 by Gualtherus Carel Jacob Vosmaer.

References

Poecilosclerida
Sponges described in 1880
Taxa named by Gualtherus Carel Jacob Vosmaer